Pseudochazara beroe is a species of butterfly in the family Nymphalidae. It is found from western Turkey across southern Transcaucasia and the Elburz Mountains to Kopet-Dagh.

Description in Seitz
S. beroe Frr. (43 g). Recalling pelopea in pattern, but the ground-colour much lighter, being glossy dust-grey, the distal band dull wax-yellow, with 2 rather large dark ocelli on the forewing. Costal margin and fringes of a whitish silky gloss. Hindwing beneath yellowish grey- brown, with a dirty white band beyond the middle. — In ab. rhena H.-Schiff. the band is more or less tinged with reddish yellow distally, and in ab. aurantiaca Stgr. (43 g, 44 a) the bands are entirely orange-yellow. — In Asia Minor, occurring more singly, from June till August.

Flight period 
The species is univoltine and on wing from mid-June to August.

Food plants
Larvae feed on grasses.

Subspecies
Pseudochazara beroe beroe
Pseudochazara aurantiaca (Staudinger, 1871) (Kopet-Dagh)
Pseudochazara rhena (Herrich-Schäffer, 1852) (Armenian Highland)

References

External links
 Satyrinae of the Western Palearctic - Pseudochazara beroe
 The Butterflies Monitoring & Photography Society of Turkey

Pseudochazara
Butterflies described in 1844